Claus Theo Gärtner (born 19 April 1943) is a German television actor mainly known for his role as Josef Matula, the main character in the German detective show series Ein Fall für Zwei (A Case For Two).

Gärtner spent his youth in Austria, the United States and southeastern Asia. He has studied music in Braunschweig and Hannover. He made his theatre debut in Göttingen. In his youth, Gärtner was actively involved in the activities of the German socialistic students' association.
 
Since 1981, Gärtner has starred as the private detective Josef Matula in 300 episodes. Gärtner is also known as a car enthusiast. Since 1967 he participated in numerous car races, and drove cars as a test-driver for a German manufacturer. He does his own car stunts in the series.

On 20 September 2008 he married his fiancée Sarah Würgler, 35 years his junior, in Winterthur. Claus Theo and Sarah had been having a relationship for 6 years prior to the wedding.

External links
 
Personal Site 
Ein Fall für Zwei ZDF Webpage 

1943 births
Living people
Male actors from Berlin
German male television actors
20th-century German male actors
21st-century German male actors
Sozialistischer Deutscher Studentenbund members